The mountains of Whernside, Ingleborough and Pen-y-ghent are collectively known as the
Three Peaks. The peaks, which form part of the
Pennine range, encircle the head of the valley of the River Ribble in the Yorkshire Dales National Park in the North of England.

Name

The long-standing designation "The Three Peaks" is well known locally, and in past times nationally. However, there are now a number of "National" Three Peaks adventure challenges involving Ben Nevis, Snowdon and Scafell Pike (respectively the highest summits in Scotland, Wales and England). The epithet "Yorkshire" is therefore now commonly added to differentiate Yorkshire's Three Peaks from those (although Whernside is partially in Cumbria, with the summit trig point being narrowly on the Cumbria side, the whole mountain is within the historic county of Yorkshire).

Geology
In common with neighbouring fells, the Three Peaks are carved from an almost flat-lying succession of sedimentary strata of Carboniferous age. The lower slopes of each of the fells are formed from massive limestones assigned to the Visean age Great Scar Group. The upper slopes of each of the fells are formed from alternating bands of limestone and mudstone grading up into sandstone, all of which are assigned to the Brigantian and early Namurian ages Yoredale Group. These alternations are considered to be a classic British example of cyclothems. Differential weathering and erosion of the various bands has given Ingleborough and Pen-y-ghent a distinctive, stepped appearance. The summits are capped by Grassington Grit, a variety of Millstone Grit.

Considerable areas of the flanks of each of the fells are covered by peat whilst other areas are blanketed by glacial till notably across the southern and eastern slopes of Pen-y-ghent. The Ribblehead drumlin field is considered to be one of the finest in England. Fringing Ingleborough on each side however are impressive areas of limestone pavement.

Extensive networks of caves have developed within the limestone strata such as the White Scar Caves, and potholes which attract cavers from all over the country. It is home to England's highest waterfall at Gaping Gill, where the Fell Beck drops  vertically down a pothole, into Britain's second largest cavern. The beck re-emerges further down the mountain adjacent to Ingleborough Cave, where visitors can take a guided tour of a floodlit part of the cave system. Whernside, being more rounded, is visually less imposing than its neighbours, but its summit is the highest point in North Yorkshire.

History
The area is rich in historical interest. The summit of Ingleborough has the remains of a huge Iron Age hill fort, while the Settle-Carlisle Railway runs between the mountains, crossing Ribblehead Viaduct at the foot of Whernside.

Leisure

Long-distance footpaths

The Pennine Way visits Horton and crosses the summit of Pen-y-ghent.
The Ribble Way follows the River Ribble from its source near the foot of Whernside to its mouth near Preston.

The Three Peaks walk

The Three Peaks walk of Pen-y-ghent, Whernside and Ingleborough is probably the original three peak walk within the UK. The first recorded ascent of the three hills was in July 1887 by J. R. Wynne-Edwards and D. R. Smith in a time of 10 hours. A challenge that many walkers aim for when undertaking the walk is to complete the walk in under 12 hours, though as Alfred Wainwright says in his book Wainwright in the Limestone  Dales, "Some participants have chosen to regard the walk as a race, and this is to be greatly regretted, walking is a pleasure to be enjoyed in comfort"  (edited quote). The route most walkers take varies from the fell race in that most traverse the 'nose' of Pen-y-ghent from Brackenbottom Moor and do not ascend from the Pennine Way. Additionally, Whernside is generally traversed along the right-of-way to the east, initially following the railway line, all of which can add extra distance to the route.

For most people the route starts in the village of Horton-in-Ribblesdale, though many start from various points in the circular route, such as Chapel-le-Dale or Ribblehead Viaduct.  Historically Chapel-le-Dale was the starting point though this probably changed when the Pen-y-ghent Cafe started running their clocking in and out service for walkers in 1968.  The cafe is currently closed (@ March 2020) and as a result walkers can no longer register the beginning and end of their walk or pay to join the Pen-y-ghent Cafe's privately owned 'Three Peaks of Yorkshire Club'.

The Yorkshire Dales National Park runs a voluntary Friends of the Three Peaks project.  The proceeds of this go towards the upkeep of the paths on the route. Certificates, medals and membership forms are awarded by local participating businesses.

The walking challenge
Understandably the Three Peaks Walk is seen by many as a challenge and it has become very popular for charity sponsored walks and Saturdays in early summer can see several hundred walkers make their way round the route.

The races
In addition to it being seen as a walking challenge it has also become a race for fell runners and cyclo-cross cyclists. However, there is no bridleway access to the peaks (except Ingleborough from the Ingleton side only) so any bicycle access is on a permissive basis on race days only.

The Three Peaks Race, has been held annually since 1954 and traditionally started at the Hill Inn until 1975, when the start moved to Horton.  In 2008 this race was also the World Long Distance Mountain Running Challenge.
The Three Peaks Cyclo-Cross race follows a longer, route across the peaks.
Yorkshire 3 Peaks Ultra, is a 70 km self navigation trails ultra marathon held annually in October. Starting in Hawes, joining the classic Yorkshire 3 Peaks route around Whernside, Ingleborough and Pen-y-ghent. Returning to Hawes via The Pennine Way.

Media
The Three Peaks were featured on the BBC Two programme Seven Natural Wonders as one of the wonders of Yorkshire.

Location of Peaks

Notes

References

External links
A guide to completing the Yorkshire Three Peaks Challenge
Route map, GPS waypoints and GPX Route for the Yorkshire 3 Peaks walk

 
Challenge walks